Association France Cricket is the official governing body of the sport of cricket in France. Its current headquarters is in Saint-Maurice, Val-de-Marne, France. France Cricket is France's representative at the International Cricket Council and is an associate member and has been a member of that body since 1998. It is also a member of the European Cricket Council.

Most of the top level players in France are immigrants from India, Pakistan, Sri Lanka or the West Indies.

History
There is documented evidence of cricket games played in France as early as 1864. By the end of the 19th century, there were about 12 club teams in France. France participated in the only Olympic Games in Paris in 1900, the only Olympics that has included cricket, and won the silver medal (although many of the players on the French team were English expatriates).

See also
 France national cricket team
 France women's national cricket team

References

External links
Cricinfo-France
France(ICC-Europe)
France Cricket

France
Cricket in France
Cricket